Ben Niemann (born July 27, 1995) is an American football linebacker for the Arizona Cardinals of the National Football League (NFL). He played college football at Iowa.

Early life and high school
Niemann was born in Des Moines, Iowa and moved several times growing up due to his father's job as a football coach. He attended Sycamore High School, in Sycamore, Illinois where he played football and basketball. In football, he played wide receiver and safety and was named first-team all-state as a junior and senior.

College career
Niemann played four seasons for the Iowa Hawkeyes, making 53 appearances and starting the last 40 games of his career. He played mostly on special teams and as a reserve linebacker as a true freshman, blocking a punt and returning the ball for a touchdown against Northwestern. Niemann became a starter at outside linebacker for Iowa going into his sophomore year and garnered honorable mention All-Big Ten Conference honors after making 45 tackles (4.5 for loss), four QB sacks and two pass break-ups. He was named honorable mention All-Big Ten again as a senior after making 80 tackles (six for loss), a sack, five passes broken up and two forced fumbles. Over the course of his career, Niemann accumulated 201 tackles, 17 tackles for loss, two interceptions, and two forced fumbles.

Professional career

Kansas City Chiefs
Niemann signed with the Kansas City Chiefs as an undrafted free agent and made the final 53-man roster out of training camp. He made his NFL debut on September 9, 2018 in the season opener against the Los Angeles Chargers, playing on special teams. Niemann made his first career start on November 11 in the Chiefs 26–14 win over the Arizona Cardinals and led the team with 6 tackles. Niemann finished his rookie season with 10 tackles made in 14 games played, mostly on special teams, and appeared in both the Chiefs postseason games, defending a pass in the endzone against the Indianapolis Colts in the divisional round and making two tackles on special teams in the AFC Championship game against the New England Patriots.

Niemann finished the 2019 regular season with 56 tackles and a pass defended and a fumble recovery in 16 games played (one start). Niemann had six tackles in the postseason, including a tackle and a hit on San Francisco 49ers quarterback Jimmy Garoppolo to force an errant throw on third down in the fourth quarter in the Chiefs Super Bowl LIV victory.

In Week 3 of the 2020 season against the Baltimore Ravens on Monday Night Football, Niemann recorded his first career sack on Lamar Jackson and recovered a fumble lost by Jackson during the 34–20 win. Overall, in the 2020 season, Niemann finished with 44 total tackles, one sack, and one forced fumble.

Niemann re-signed with the Chiefs on March 17, 2021.

Arizona Cardinals
Niemann signed with the Arizona Cardinals on June 16, 2022.

Personal life
Niemann is the son of Jay and Lou Ann Niemann. His father is currently the Assistant Defensive Line Coach and Defensive Recruiting Coordinator for Iowa and had previously served as the Defensive Coordinator at Rutgers and Northern Illinois and as the head coach at Simpson College. He has a younger brother, Nick Niemann, who currently plays linebacker for the Los Angeles Chargers.

References

External links
Kansas City Chiefs bio
Iowa Hawkeyes bio

1995 births
Living people
American football linebackers
Arizona Cardinals players
Iowa Hawkeyes football players
Kansas City Chiefs players
People from Sycamore, Illinois
Players of American football from Illinois
Sportspeople from the Chicago metropolitan area